Julius "Julie" Berman (born 1935) is an American attorney and Orthodox rabbi. He is involved in many large Jewish organizations, many of them non-denominational, and has served in key leadership positions.

Early life and education 
Berman was born in Dūkštas, 
Lithuania and raised in Hartford, Connecticut, the son of Henoch, a rabbi, and shochet and Sarah Berman. He first attended Yeshiva of Hartford elementary school, and was in its first graduating class. He graduated from Yeshiva Torah Vodaas high school in 1952. He then attended Yeshiva University, graduating from Yeshiva College in 1956, and receiving ordination from the Rabbi Isaac Elchanan Theological Seminary in 1959. He received his Juris Doctor from the New York University School of Law in 1960, graduating cum laude and first in his class.

He received an honorary doctorate from Yeshiva University in 1995.

Career 
As a confidant of Rabbi Joseph B. Soloveitchik, zt"l, Rabbi Berman was, and is, instrumental in publishing "the Rav's" works. Professionally, he is a partner in the law firm of Arnold & Porter Kaye Scholer.

Organizations
Berman is a longstanding board member of RIETS, and is chairman emeritus of the board, having served as its chairman for many years. He has been president of the Conference on Jewish Material Claims against Germany since 2014, and was previously chairman of its board. He has headed many national and international Jewish organizations, including the Conference of Presidents of Major American Jewish Organizations, the Orthodox Union, the Jewish Telegraphic Agency and the American Zionist Youth Foundation.

He served in a leadership capacity at the following organizations:

National Jewish Commission on Law and Public Affairs (COLPA)
OU - Orthodox Union - Union of Orthodox Jewish Congregations in America
Conference of Presidents of Major American Jewish Organizations
 American Zionist Youth Foundation (AZYF)
Jewish Telegraphic Agency (JTA); president from 1989 until merger to 70 Faces
 Chairman of the Board, of the RIETS - Rabbi Isaac Elchanan Theological Seminary and the Claims Conference - the Conference on Jewish Material Claims Against Germany.

Personal life 
Berman is married to Dorothy "Dotty" Berman, a graduate of the Stern College for Women and Ferkauf Graduate School of Psychology. They have three children, nine grandchildren and five great-grandchildren. His Yiddish name is Yudl. Berman's nephew is Ari Berman, President of Yeshiva University.

References

Living people
Leaders of organizations
American lawyers
Yeshiva University alumni
New York University School of Law alumni
American Orthodox rabbis
Kaye Scholer partners
21st-century American Jews
1935 births